The Flower of Evil (original title: La fleur du mal) is a 2003 French suspense drama film by Claude Chabrol.

It tells of an outwardly perfect family in Bordeaux, whose seeming perfection begins to unravel when the wife involves herself in politics.  A corpse surfaces just before the local election and the spectre of past family indiscretion resurfaces in mysterious deaths and other scandals.

Plot
In a grand house at Bordeaux lives Gérard, owner of a pharmaceutical business. A drinker and fornicator, he disgusts his son François, recently returned from the USA. To Gérard's disgust, his second wife Anne is a candidate in the municipal election.

Anne's old aunt Line encourages the pair.

Anne's campaign takes a jolt when she and her family are smeared in an anonymous tract. The family suspect that Gérard is the author. Not everybody believes the slanders and the outgoing mayor, impressed by Anne's qualities, promises her his job if she wins a seat.

On the night of the count everybody is at the town hall except Michèle, who has to finish an assignment for her university course. Gérard sneaks home drunk and tries to rape her, but in the struggle falls and dies.

Line then confesses to Michèle that she had loved her brother too closely, until he was executed in the Second World War as a member of the French Resistance. The man who ordered the execution was their father, a Nazi collaborator, so Line killed him. She says she will now take the blame for killing Gérard.

A cavalcade of hooting cars then sweeps into the drive and Anne's supporters throng into the house to toast her victory in champagne.

Cast
 Nathalie Baye : Anne / Wife
 Benoît Magimel : François / Gerard's son
 Suzanne Flon : Aunt Line
 Bernard Le Coq : Gérard / Husband
 Mélanie Doutey : 	Michèle / Anne's daughter
 Thomas Chabrol : Matthieu Lartigue
 Henri Attal : Fanny's Father-in-law
 Françoise Bertin : Thérèse

Reception
On Rotten Tomatoes the film holds an approval rating 64% based on 61 reviews. Detroit Free Press said: "The strength of this movie is how it starts as a standard whodunit only to become something else: a cunning Chabrol study of incest and old money peppered with a wicked sense of humor." SFGate remarked "Chabrol's examination of intergenerational guilt takes awhile to arrive at the station, but the characters and dialogue... are sophisticated and properly witty." Wesley Morris in The Boston Globe said: "If it's not vintage Claude Chabrol, it's at least vintage mediocre Claude Chabrol. His umpteenth housebound suspicion-fest is one of his more inexplicable adventures in secrets and scandal."  Slant Magazine called it "a disappointment", and added "Chabrol has always been hung-up on bourgeois rituals, hypocrisies, and idiosyncrasies, but every observation here is mundane or simply inconsequential to the film’s larger and severely undervalued dialectic of a so-called "perpetual present."

Awards and nominations

Entry
Berlin International Film Festival Official Selection

Nominated
Goya Awards
Best European Film (lost to Good Bye Lenin!)

References

External links 
 

2003 films
2003 drama films
Films about families
Films set in Bordeaux
2000s French-language films
Films directed by Claude Chabrol
Films produced by Marin Karmitz
French drama films
2000s French films